Kuajok, also spelled as Kuacjok or Kwajok, is a city in South Sudan, and the capital of Warrap State.

Location
Kuajok is located in Warrap State, in Bahr el Ghazal Region, in northwestern South Sudan, near the international border with the Republic of Sudan and the Abyei Region. The coordinates of the town are: 8° 18′ 36.00″ N, 27° 59' 24.00" E (Latitude: 8.3100; Longitude: 27.9900).

Overview
The city of Kuajok lies on Highway B38, along the western bank of the Jur River, close to the geographic point where the borders of Northern Bahr el Ghazal State, Warrap State and Western Bahr el Ghazal State intersect. Approximately  further north on B38 lies the town of Gogrial, one of two places where the former NBA player, Manute Bol, might have been born. Kuajok serves as the capital of Warrap State.

Points of interest
The following points of interest lie in or near the town of Kuajok:

 The Jur River - The river passes to the east of the town
 Gogrial Airport - A small civilian airport, with a single unpaved runway
 The main road from Wau to Babanusa, Sudan (Highway B38) passes through Kuajok in a north to south direction

See also
 Warrap State
 Bahr el Ghazal Region
 Gogrial
 Wau
Dinka people
Nuer people

External list
Location of Kwajok At Google Maps

References

State capitals in South Sudan
Populated places in Warrap (state)
Warrap (state)